The 24th United States Congress was a meeting of the legislative branch of the United States federal government, consisting of the United States Senate and the United States House of Representatives. It met in Washington, D.C. from March 4, 1835, to March 4, 1837, during the seventh and eighth years of Andrew Jackson's presidency.  The apportionment of seats in the House of Representatives was based on the 1830 United States census. Both chambers had a Jacksonian majority.

Tensions with France 
Throughout 1835 relations between the United States and France reached an all-time low.  Andrew Jackson had America's ambassador to France travel aboard a gunboat and after negotiations broke down had the American ambassador recalled back to the United States and forced the French ambassador to leave.  President Jackson and the French government traded threats and insults throughout the duration of the year.  In this conflict President Jackson got support from many members of the House of Representatives.  In late November 1835 Linn Boyd, Albert G. Hawes, Richard M. Johnson, John E. Coffee, Seaton Grantland, Charles Eaton Haynes, Jabez Young Jackson, George Welshman Owens, Thomas Glascock, William Schley, Reuben Chapman, Joshua L. Martin, Joab Lawler, Jesse Atherton Bynum, Jesse Speight, James Iver McKay, Micajah Thomas Hawkins, William Montgomery, Henry William Connor and James Rogers (congressman) all put in writing that if President Jackson were to formally declare war on France he would have their full support.  Shortly after this when the government of the United Kingdom sought to intervene, the same twenty Congressmen signed a letter stating that they welcomed the "wholesome and moderating influence" of British Prime Minister William Lamb, 2nd Viscount Melbourne, British foreign secretary Henry John Temple, 3rd Viscount Palmerston and the British Secretary of State for War and the Colonies Charles Grant, 1st Baron Glenelg, who the letter referred to as "our thoughtful cousins."  The same document referred to the France's leader Louis Philippe I as "dastardly and pusinallimous."  Senators Bedford Brown, Robert J. Walker, Felix Grundy, John Pendleton King and Alfred Cuthbert all wrote to President Jackson saying that they felt the same way as the aforementioned twenty members of the house "with respects to our relations with Britain and France" and "any potential war" that might break out between the United States and France.  In a series of popular outbursts in July 1836, effigies of Louis Philippe I were burnt in Georgia, South Carolina, North Carolina, Kentucky, Tennessee, Alabama and Mississippi.  In October 1836 it became known the French were "backing down," celebrations that were "overtly triumphant" and "distinctly anti-French" were held throughout Kentucky, Tennessee, North Carolina, Georgia, Alabama and Mississippi during the last two weeks of October 1836.

Major events 

 December 28, 1835: The Second Seminole War began. Seminole fighter Osceola and his warriors attack government agent Thompson outside Fort King in central Florida.
 1835: Toledo War fought between Ohio and Michigan Territory over the city of Toledo and the Toledo Strip.
 February 3, 1836: United States Whig Party held its first convention in Albany, New York.
 February 23, 1836: Siege of the Alamo began in San Antonio, Texas.
 July 11, 1836: President Andrew Jackson issued the Specie Circular, beginning the failure of the land speculation economy that would lead to the Panic of 1837.
 July 13, 1836: United States patent #1 was granted after filing 9,957 unnumbered patents.
 November 3 – December 7, 1836: 1836 presidential election: Martin Van Buren defeated William Henry Harrison, but Virginia's electors refused to vote for Van Buren's running mate, Richard Mentor Johnson, thereby denying victory to any vice presidential candidate.
 December 4, 1836: Whig Party held its first national convention, in Harrisburg, Pennsylvania.
 December 15, 1836: 1836 U.S. Patent Office fire
 February 8, 1837: Richard Mentor Johnson defeated Francis Granger to win the (first and to date only) contingent election for Vice President of the United States.

Major legislation

 July 4, 1836: Patent Act of 1836, 
 Mar 3, 1837: Eighth and Ninth Circuits Act of 1837,

Treaties 

 December 29, 1835: Treaty of New Echota signed, ceding all the lands of the Cherokee east of the Mississippi to the United States

States admitted and territories formed 

June 15, 1836: Arkansas admitted as the 25th state 
July 3, 1836: Wisconsin Territory established; approved April 20, 1836 
January 26, 1837: Michigan admitted as the 26th state ; contingently approved June 15, 1836

Party summary
The count below identifies party affiliations at the beginning of the first session of this congress. Changes resulting from subsequent replacements are shown below in the "Changes in membership" section.

Senate 
During this congress two Senate seats were added for each of the new states of Arkansas and Michigan.

House of Representatives
During this congress one House seat was added for each of the new states of Arkansas and Michigan.

Leadership

Senate 
 President: Martin Van Buren (J)
 President pro tempore: William R. King (J)

House of Representatives 
 Speaker:  James K. Polk (J)

Members
This list is arranged by chamber, then by state. Senators are listed by class, and representatives are listed by district.

Skip to House of Representatives, below

Senate
Senators were elected by the state legislatures every two years, with one-third beginning new six-year terms with each Congress. Preceding the names in the list below are Senate class numbers, which indicate the cycle of their election. In this Congress, Class 1 meant their term began in the last Congress, requiring re-election in 1838; Class 2 meant their term began with this Congress, requiring re-election in 1840; and Class 3 meant their term ended with this Congress, requiring re-election in 1836.

Alabama 
 2. William R. D. King (J)
 3. Gabriel Moore (NR)

Arkansas 
 2. William S. Fulton (J), from September 18, 1836 (newly admitted state)
 3. Ambrose H. Sevier (J), from September 18, 1836 (newly admitted state)

Connecticut 
 1. Nathan Smith (NR), until December 6, 1835
 John M. Niles (J), from December 21, 1835
 3. Gideon Tomlinson (NR)

Delaware 
 1. Arnold Naudain (NR), until June 16, 1836
 Richard H. Bayard (NR), from June 17, 1836
 2. John M. Clayton (NR), until December 29, 1836
 Thomas Clayton (NR), from January 9, 1837

Georgia 
 2. John P. King (J)
 3. Alfred Cuthbert (J)

Illinois 
 2. John M. Robinson (J)
 3. Elias K. Kane (J), until December 12, 1835
 William L. D. Ewing (J), from December 30, 1835

Indiana 
 1. John Tipton (J)
 3. William Hendricks (NR)

Kentucky 
 2. John J. Crittenden (NR)
 3. Henry Clay (NR)

Louisiana 
 2. Robert C. Nicholas (J), from January 13, 1836
 3. Alexander Porter (NR), until January 5, 1837
 Alexander Mouton (J), from January 12, 1837

Maine 
 1. Ether Shepley (J), until March 3, 1836
 Judah Dana (J), from December 7, 1836
 2. John Ruggles (J)

Maryland 
 1. Joseph Kent (NR)
 3. Robert H. Goldsborough (NR), until October 5, 1836
 John S. Spence (NR), from December 31, 1836

Massachusetts 
 1. Daniel Webster (NR)
 2. John Davis (NR)

Michigan 
 1. Lucius Lyon (J), from January 26, 1837 (newly admitted state)
 2. John Norvell (J), from January 26, 1837 (newly admitted state)

Mississippi 
 1. John Black (NR)
 2. Robert J. Walker (J)

Missouri 
 1. Thomas H. Benton (J)
 3. Lewis F. Linn (J)

New Hampshire 
 2. Henry Hubbard (J)
 3. Isaac Hill (J), until May 30, 1836
 John Page (J), from June 8, 1836

New Jersey 
 1. Samuel L. Southard (NR)
 2. Garret D. Wall (J)

New York 
 1. Nathaniel P. Tallmadge (J)
 3. Silas Wright Jr. (J)

North Carolina 
 2. Bedford Brown (J)
 3. Willie P. Mangum (NR), until November 26, 1836
 Robert Strange (J), from December 5, 1836

Ohio 
 1. Thomas Morris (J)
 3. Thomas Ewing (NR)

Pennsylvania 
 1. Samuel McKean (J)
 3. James Buchanan (J)

Rhode Island 
 1. Asher Robbins (NR)
 2. Nehemiah R. Knight (NR)

South Carolina 
 2. John C. Calhoun (N)
 3. William C. Preston (N)

Tennessee 
 1. Felix Grundy (J)
 2. Hugh Lawson White (NR)

Vermont 
 1. Benjamin Swift (NR)
 3. Samuel Prentiss (NR)

Virginia 
 1. John Tyler (NR), until February 29, 1836
 William C. Rives (J), from March 4, 1836
 2. Benjamin W. Leigh (NR), until July 4, 1836
 Richard E. Parker (J), from December 12, 1836

House of Representatives
The names of members of the House of Representatives are preceded by their district numbers.

Alabama 
 . Reuben Chapman (J)
 . Joshua L. Martin (J)
 . Joab Lawler (J)
 . Dixon H. Lewis (N)
 . Francis S. Lyon (NR)

Arkansas 
 . Archibald Yell (J), from August 1, 1836 (newly admitted state)

Connecticut 
All representatives were elected statewide on a general ticket.
 . Elisha Haley (J)
 . Samuel Ingham (J)
 . Andrew T. Judson (J), until July 4, 1836
 Orrin Holt (J), from December 5, 1836
 . Lancelot Phelps (J)
 . Isaac Toucey (J)
 . Zalmon Wildman (J), until December 10, 1835
 Thomas T. Whittlesey (J), from April 29, 1836

Delaware 
 . John J. Milligan (NR)

Georgia 
All representatives were elected statewide on a general ticket.
 . John E. Coffee (J), until September 25, 1836
 William C. Dawson (SR), from November 7, 1836
 . Seaton Grantland (J)
 . Charles E. Haynes (J)
 . Jabez Y. Jackson (J), from October 5, 1835
 . George W. Owens (J)
 . John W. A. Sanford (J), until July 25, 1835
 Thomas Glascock (J), from October 5, 1835 
 . William Schley (J), until July 1, 1835
 Jesse F. Cleveland (J), from October 5, 1835
 . James C. Terrell (J), until July 8, 1835
 Hopkins Holsey (J), from October 5, 1835
 . George W. B. Towns (J), until September 1, 1836
 Julius C. Alford (NR), from January 2, 1837

Illinois 
 . John Reynolds (J)
 . Zadok Casey (J)
 . William L. May (J)

Indiana 
 . Ratliff Boon (J)
 . John W. Davis (J)
 . John Carr (J)
 . Amos Lane (J)
 . Johnathan McCarty (NR)
 . George L. Kinnard (J), until November 26, 1836
 William Herod (NR), from January 25, 1837
 . Edward A. Hannegan (J)

Kentucky 
 . Linn Boyd (J)
 . Albert G. Hawes (J)
 . Joseph R. Underwood (NR)
 . Sherrod Williams (NR)
 . James Harlan (NR)
 . John Calhoon (NR)
 . Benjamin Hardin (NR)
 . William J. Graves (NR)
 . John White (NR)
 . Chilton Allan (NR)
 . Richard French (J)
 . John Chambers (NR)
 . Richard M. Johnson (J)

Louisiana 
 . Henry Johnson (NR)
 . Eleazar W. Ripley (J)
 . Rice Garland (NR)

Maine 
 . John Fairfield (J)
 . Francis O. J. Smith (J)
 . Jeremiah Bailey (NR)
 . George Evans (NR)
 . Moses Mason Jr. (J)
 . Leonard Jarvis (J)
 . Joseph Hall (J)
 . Gorham Parks (J)

Maryland 
The 4th district was a plural district with two representatives.
 . John N. Steele (NR)
 . James A. Pearce (NR)
 . James Turner (J)
 . Benjamin C. Howard (J)
 . Isaac McKim (J)
 . George C. Washington (NR)
 . Francis Thomas (J)
 . Daniel Jenifer (NR)

Massachusetts 
 . Abbott Lawrence (NR)
 . Stephen C. Phillips (NR)
 . Caleb Cushing (NR)
 . Samuel Hoar (NR)
 . Levi Lincoln Jr. (NR)
 . George J. Grennell Jr. (NR)
 . George N. Briggs (NR)
 . William B. Calhoun (NR)
 . William Jackson (AM)
 . Nathaniel B. Borden (J)
 . John Reed Jr. (AM)
 . John Quincy Adams (AM)

Michigan 
 . Isaac E. Crary (J), from January 26, 1837 (newly admitted state)

Mississippi 
Both representatives were elected statewide on a general ticket.
 . John F. H. Claiborne (J)
 . David Dickson (NR), until July 31, 1836
 Samuel J. Gholson (J), from December 1, 1836

Missouri 
Both representatives were elected statewide on a general ticket.
 . William H. Ashley (NR)
 . Albert G. Harrison (J)

New Hampshire 
All representatives were elected statewide on a general ticket.
 . Benning M. Bean (J)
 . Robert Burns (J)
 . Samuel Cushman (J)
 . Franklin Pierce (J)
 . Joseph Weeks (J)

New Jersey 
All representatives were elected statewide on a general ticket.
 . Philemon Dickerson (J), until November 3, 1836
 William Chetwood (NR), from December 5, 1836
 . Samuel Fowler (J)
 . Thomas Lee (J)
 . James Parker (J)
 . Ferdinand S. Schenck (J)
 . William N. Shinn (J)

New York 
There were four plural districts, the 8th, 17th, 22nd & 23rd had two representatives each, the 3rd had four representatives.
 . Abel Huntington (J)
 . Samuel Barton (J)
 . Churchill C. Cambreleng (J)
 . Campbell P. White (J), until October 2, 1835
 Gideon Lee (J), from November 4, 1835
 . John McKeon (J)
 . Ely Moore (J)
 . Aaron Ward (J)
 . Abraham Bockee (J)
 . John W. Brown (J)
 . Nicholas Sickles (J)
 . Valentine Efner (J)
 . Aaron Vanderpoel (J)
 . Hiram P. Hunt (NR)
 . Gerrit Y. Lansing (J)
 . John Cramer (J)
 . David A. Russell (NR)
 . Dudley Farlin (J)
 . Ransom H. Gillet (J)
 . Matthias J. Bovee (J)
 . Abijah Mann Jr. (J)
 . Samuel Beardsley (J), until March 29, 1836
 Rutger B. Miller (J), from November 9, 1836 
 . Joel Turrill (J)
 . Daniel Wardwell (J)
 . Sherman Page (J)
 . William Seymour (J)
 . William Mason (J)
 . Stephen B. Leonard (J)
 . Joseph Reynolds (J)
 . William K. Fuller (J)
 . William Taylor (J)
 . Ulysses F. Doubleday (J)
 . Graham H. Chapin (J)
 . Francis Granger (NR)
 . Joshua Lee (J)
 . Timothy Childs (NR)
 . George W. Lay (NR)
 . Philo C. Fuller (NR), until September 2, 1836
 John Young (NR), from November 9, 1836
 . Abner Hazeltine (NR)
 . Thomas C. Love (NR)
 . Gideon Hard (NR)

North Carolina 
 . William B. Shepard (NR)
 . Jesse A. Bynum (J)
 . Ebenezer Pettigrew (NR)
 . Jesse Speight (J)
 . James I. McKay (J)
 . Micajah T. Hawkins (J)
 . Edmund Deberry (NR)
 . William Montgomery (J)
 . Augustine H. Shepperd (NR)
 . Abraham Rencher (NR)
 . Henry W. Connor (J)
 . James Graham (NR), until March 29, 1836, and from December 5, 1836
 . Lewis Williams (NR)

Ohio 
 . Bellamy Storer (NR)
 . Taylor Webster (J)
 . Joseph H. Crane (NR)
 . Thomas Corwin (NR)
 . Thomas L. Hamer (J)
 . Samuel F. Vinton (NR)
 . William K. Bond (NR)
 . Jeremiah McLene (J)
 . John Chaney (J)
 . Samson Mason (NR)
 . William Kennon Sr. (J)
 . Elias Howell (NR)
 . David Spangler (NR)
 . William Patterson (J)
 . Jonathan Sloane (AM)
 . Elisha Whittlesey (NR)
 . John Thomson (J)
 . Benjamin Jones (J)
 . Daniel Kilgore (J)

Pennsylvania 
There were two plural districts, the 2nd had two representatives, the 4th had three representatives.
 . Joel B. Sutherland (J)
 . James Harper (NR)
 . Joseph R. Ingersoll (NR)
 . Michael W. Ash (J)
 . Edward Darlington (AM)
 . William Hiester (AM)
 . David Potts Jr. (AM)
 . Jacob Fry Jr. (J)
 . Mathias Morris (NR)
 . David D. Wagener (J)
 . Edward B. Hubley (J)
 . Henry A. P. Muhlenberg (J)
 . William Clark (AM)
 . Henry Logan (J)
 . George Chambers (AM)
 . Jesse Miller (J), until October 30, 1836
 James Black (J), from December 5, 1836
 . Joseph Henderson (J)
 . Andrew Beaumont (J)
 . Joseph B. Anthony (J)
 . John Laporte (J)
 . Job Mann (J)
 . John J. Klingensmith Jr. (J)
 . Andrew Buchanan (J)
 . Thomas M. T. McKennan (AM)
 . Harmar Denny (AM)
 . Samuel S. Harrison (J)
 . John Banks (AM), until March 31, 1836 
 John J. Pearson (NR), from December 5, 1836
 . John Galbraith (J)

Rhode Island 
Both representatives were elected statewide on a general ticket.
 . Dutee J. Pearce (AM)
 . William Sprague (AM)

South Carolina 
 . Henry L. Pinckney (N)
 . William J. Grayson (N)
 . Robert B. Campbell (N)
 . James H. Hammond (N), until February 26, 1836
 Franklin H. Elmore (N), from December 10, 1836
 . Francis W. Pickens (N)
 . Waddy Thompson Jr. (NR), from September 10, 1835
 . James Rogers (J)
 . Richard I. Manning (J), until May 1, 1836
 John P. Richardson (J), from December 19, 1836
 . John K. Griffin (N)

Tennessee 
 . William B. Carter (NR)
 . Samuel Bunch (NR)
 . Luke Lea (NR)
 . James I. Standifer (NR)
 . John B. Forester (NR)
 . Balie Peyton (NR)
 . John Bell (NR)
 . Abram P. Maury (NR)
 . James K. Polk (J)
 . Ebenezer J. Shields (NR)
 . Cave Johnson (J)
 . Adam Huntsman (J)
 . William C. Dunlap (J)

Vermont 
 . Hiland Hall (NR)
 . William Slade (AM)
 . Horace Everett (NR)
 . Heman Allen (NR)
 . Henry F. Janes (AM)

Virginia 
 . George Loyall (J)
 . John Y. Mason (J), until January 11, 1837
 . John W. Jones (J)
 . George C. Dromgoole (J)
 . James W. Bouldin (J)
 . Walter Coles (J)
 . Nathaniel H. Claiborne (NR)
 . Henry A. Wise (J)
 . John Roane (J)
 . John Taliaferro (NR)
 . John Robertson (NR)
 . James Garland (J)
 . John M. Patton (J)
 . Charles F. Mercer (NR)
 . Edward Lucas (J)
 . James M. H. Beale (J)
 . Robert Craig (J)
 . George W. Hopkins (J)
 . William McComas (NR)
 . Joseph Johnson (J)
 . William S. Morgan (J)

Non-voting members 
 . Ambrose H. Sevier (J), until June 15, 1836
 . Joseph M. White (J)
 . George Wallace Jones (J), until January 26, 1837
 . George Wallace Jones (J), from January 26, 1837

Changes in membership
The count below reflects changes from the beginning of the first session of this Congress.

Senate 
 Replacements: 11
 National Republicans: 5-seat net loss
 Jacksonians: 10-seat net gain
 Deaths: 3
 Resignations: 8
 Interim appointments: 0
 Seats of newly admitted states: 4
 Total seats with changes: 16

|-
| Louisiana(2)
| Vacant
| Senator-elect Charles E.A. Gayarre had resigned on account of ill-health.Successor was elected January 13, 1836.
|  | Robert C. Nicholas (J)
| January 13, 1836

|-
| Connecticut(1)
|  | Nathan Smith (NR)
| Died December 6, 1835Successor was elected December 21, 1835.
|  | John M. Niles (J)
| December 21, 1835.

|-
| Illinois(3)
|  | Elias Kane (J)
| Died December 12, 1835Successor was appointed December 30, 1835.
|  | William Lee D. Ewing (J)
| December 30, 1835

|-
| Virginia(1)
|  | John Tyler (NR)
| Resigned February 29, 1836Successor was elected March 4, 1836.
|  | William C. Rives (J)
| March 4, 1836

|-
| Maine(1)
|  | Ether Shepley (J)
| Resigned March 3, 1836Successor was appointed December 7, 1836.
|  | Judah Dana (J)
| December 7, 1836

|-
| New Hampshire(3)
|  | Isaac Hill (J)
| Resigned May 30, 1836, to become Governor of New Hampshire.Successor was elected June 8, 1836.
|  | John Page (J)
| June 8, 1836

|-
| Delaware(1)
|  | Arnold Naudain (NR)
| Resigned June 16, 1836Successor was elected June 17, 1836.
|  | Richard H. Bayard (NR)
| June 17, 1836

|-
| Virginia(2)
|  | Benjamin W. Leigh (NR)
| Resigned July 4, 1836Successor was elected December 12, 1836.
|  | Richard E. Parker (J)
| December 12, 1836

|-
| Arkansas(2)
| rowspan=2 | New seats
| rowspan=2 | Arkansas was admitted to the Union.Its new Senators were elected September 18, 1836.
|  | William S. Fulton (J)
| September 18, 1836.

|-
| Arkansas(3)
|  | Ambrose H. Sevier (J)
| September 18, 1836.

|-
| Maryland(3)
|  | Robert H. Goldsborough (NR)
| Died October 5, 1836Successor was elected December 31, 1836.
|  | John S. Spence (NR)
| December 31, 1836

|-
| North Carolina(3)
|  | Willie P. Mangum (NR)
| Resigned November 26, 1836Successor was elected December 5, 1836.
|  | Robert Strange (J)
| December 5, 1836

|-
| Delaware(2)
|  | John M. Clayton (NR)
| Resigned December 29, 1836Successor was elected January 9, 1837.
|  | Thomas Clayton (NR)
| January 9, 1837

|-
| Louisiana(3)
|  | Alexander Porter (NR)
| Resigned January 5, 1837, due to ill health.Successor was elected January 12, 1837.
|  | Alexandre Mouton (J)
| January 12, 1837

|-
| Michigan(1)
| rowspan=2 | New seats
| rowspan=2 | Michigan was admitted to the Union.Its new Senators were elected January 6, 1837.
|  | Lucius Lyon (J)
| January 26, 1837.

|-
| Michigan(2)
|  | John Norvell (J)
| January 26, 1837.

|}

House of Representatives 
 Replacements: 18
 National Republicans: 5-seat net gain
 Anti-Masonics: 1-seat net loss
 Jacksonians: 2-seat net loss
 Nullifiers: No net change
 Deaths: 5
 Resignations: 13
 Contested election: 0
 Seats of newly admitted states: 2
 Total seats with changes: 24

|-
| 
| Vacant
| Rep. Warren R. Davis died during previous congress
|  | Waddy Thompson Jr. (NR)
| Seated September 10, 1835

|-
| 
| Vacant
| Rep. James M. Wayne resigned in previous congress
|  | Jabez Y. Jackson (J)
| Seated October 5, 1835

|-
| 
|  | William Schley (J)
| Resigned July 1, 1835 when nominated for Governor of Georgia.
|  | Jesse F. Cleveland (J)
| Seated October 5, 1835

|-
| 
|  | James C. Terrell (J)
| Resigned July 8, 1835, due to ill health
|  | Hopkins Holsey (J)
| Seated October 5, 1835

|-
| 
|  | John W. A. Sanford (J)
| Resigned July 25, 1835, to assist in the Cherokee Indian removal
|  | Thomas Glascock (J)
| Seated October 5, 1835

|-
| 
|  | Campbell P. White (J)
| Resigned October 2, 1835
|  | Gideon Lee (J)
| Seated November 4, 1835

|-
| 
|  | Zalmon Wildman (J)
| Died December 10, 1835
|  | Thomas T. Whittlesey (J)
| Seated April 29, 1836

|-
| 
|  | James H. Hammond (N)
| Resigned February 26, 1836, because of ill health
|  | Franklin H. Elmore (N)
| Seated December 10, 1836

|-
| 
|  | Samuel Beardsley (J)
| Resigned March 29, 1836
|  | Rutger B. Miller (J)
| Seated November 9, 1836

|-
| 
|  | James Graham (NR)
| Seat declared vacant March 29, 1836
|  | James Graham (NR)
| Seated December 5, 1836

|-
| 
|  | John Banks (AM)
| Resigned March 31, 1836
|  | John J. Pearson (NR)
| Seated December 5, 1836

|-
| 
|  | Richard I. Manning (J)
| Died May 1, 1836
|  | John P. Richardson (J)
| Seated December 19, 1836

|-
| nowrap | 
|  | Ambrose H. Sevier (J)
| colspan=3 | Seat was eliminated when Arkansas achieved statehood June 15, 1836

|-
| 
|  | Andrew T. Judson (J)
| Resigned July 4, 1836 to become judge of the United States District Court for the District of Connecticut.
|  | Orrin Holt (J)
| Seated December 5, 1836

|-
| 
|  | David Dickson (NR)
| Died July 31, 1836
|  | Samuel J. Gholson (J)
| Seated December 1, 1836

|-
| nowrap | 
| Vacant
| Arkansas was admitted to the Union on June 15, 1836
|  | Archibald Yell (J)
| Seated August 1, 1836

|-
| 
|  | George W. Towns (J)
| Resigned September 1, 1836
|  | Julius C. Alford (NR)
| Seated January 2, 1837

|-
| 
|  | Philo C. Fuller (NR)
| Resigned September 2, 1836
|  | John Young (NR)
| Seated November 9, 1836

|-
| 
|  | John E. Coffee (J)
| Died September 25, 1836
|  | William C. Dawson (NR)
| Seated November 7, 1836

|-
| 
|  | Jesse Miller (J)
| Resigned October 30, 1836
|  | James Black (J)
| Seated December 5, 1836

|-
| 
|  | Philemon Dickerson (J)
| Resigned November 3, 1836 to become Governor of New Jersey.
|  | William Chetwood (NR)
| Seated December 5, 1836

|-
| 
|  | George L. Kinnard (J)
| Died November 26, 1836
|  | William Herod (NR)
| Seated January 25, 1837

|-
| 
|  | John Y. Mason (J)
| Resigned January 11, 1837
| Vacant
| Not filled this congress

|-
| nowrap | 
|  | George Wallace Jones (J)
| colspan=3 | Seat was eliminated when Michigan achieved statehood January 26, 1837

|-
| nowrap | 
| Vacant
| Michigan was admitted to the Union on January 26, 1837
|  | Isaac E. Crary (J)
| Seated January 26, 1837

|-
| 
| Vacant
| Wisconsin Territory was organized on April 3, 1836
|  | George Wallace Jones (J)
| Seated January 26, 1837

|}

Committees
Lists of committees and their party leaders.

Senate

 Agriculture (Chairman: Bedford Brown then John Page)
 Audit and Control the Contingent Expenses of the Senate (Chairman: Samuel McKean)
 Claims (Chairman: Arnold Naudain then Henry Hubbard)
 Commerce (Chairman: Robert Henry Goldsborough then John Davis)
 Constitution of the State of Arkansas (Select) 
 Distributing Public Revenue Among the States (Select) 
 District of Columbia (Chairman: John Tyler then Joseph Kent)
 Engrossed Bills (Chairman: Ether Shepley then Thomas Morris)
 Finance (Chairman: Daniel Webster then Silas Wright)
 Foreign Relations (Chairman: Henry Clay then James Buchanan)
 Incendiary Publications (Select) 
 Indian Affairs (Chairman: Hugh Lawson White then Ambrose Sevier)
 Judiciary (Chairman: John M. Clayton then Felix Grundy)
 Letter from Mr. Poindexter (Select) 
 Manufactures (Chairman: Nehemiah Knight)
 Mileage of Members of Congress (Select) 
 Military Affairs (Chairman: Thomas Hart Benton)
 Militia (Chairman: John M. Robinson)
 Naval Affairs (Chairman: Samuel Southard then William C. Rives)
 Ohio-Michigan Boundary (Select)
 Patent Office (Select) 
 Pensions (Chairman: Gideon Tomlinson)
 Post Office and Post Roads (Chairman: Felix Grundy)
 Private Land Claims (Chairman: John Black then Lewis Linn)
 Public Lands (Chairman: Thomas Ewing then Robert J. Walker)
 Purchasing Boyd Reilly's Gas Apparatus (Select) (Chairman: N/A)
 Revolutionary Claims (Chairman: Gabriel Moore then Bedford Brown)
 Roads and Canals (Chairman: William Hendricks)
 Sale of Public Lands (Select) 
 Tariff Regulation (Select) 
 Whole

House of Representatives

 Accounts (Chairman: N/A)
 Agriculture (Chairman: Abraham Bockee)
 Amendment to the Constitution (Select)
 Banks of the District of Columbia (Select) 
 Claims (Chairman: N/A)
 Commerce (Chairman: N/A)
 District of Columbia (Chairman: N/A)
 Elections (Chairman: N/A)
 Expenditures in the Navy Department (Chairman: N/A)
 Expenditures in the Post Office Department (Chairman: N/A)
 Expenditures in the State Department (Chairman: N/A)
 Expenditures in the Treasury Department (Chairman: N/A)
 Expenditures in the War Department (Chairman: N/A)
 Expenditures on Public Buildings (Chairman: N/A)
 Foreign Affairs (Chairman: Benjamin C. Howard)
 Indian Affairs (Chairman: N/A)
 Invalid Pensions (Chairman: N/A)
 Judiciary (Chairman: Samuel Beardsley then Francis Thomas)
 Manufactures (Chairman: N/A)
 Military Affairs (Chairman: N/A)
 Militia (Chairman: N/A)
 Naval Affairs (Chairman: N/A)
 Post Office and Post Roads (Chairman: N/A)
 Public Expenditures (Chairman: N/A)
 Public Lands (Chairman: Ratliff Boon)
 Revisal and Unfinished Business (Chairman: N/A)
 Revolutionary Claims (Chairman: N/A)
 Roads and Canals (Chairman: N/A)
 Rules (Select) 
 Standards of Official Conduct 
 Territories (Chairman: N/A)
 Ways and Means (Chairman: Churchill C. Cambreleng)
 Whole

Joint committees

 Enrolled Bills
 The Library

Employees 
 Librarian of Congress: John Silva Meehan

Senate 
 Chaplain: Frederick Winslow Hatch (Episcopalian), until December 23, 1835
 Edward Y. Higbee (Episcopalian), elected December 23, 1835
 John R. Goodman (Episcopalian), elected December 28, 1836
 Secretary: Walter Lowrie until December 11, 1836
 Asbury Dickins, elected December 12, 1836
 Sergeant at Arms: John Shackford

House of Representatives 
 Chaplain: Edward Dunlap Smith (Presbyterian), until December 7, 1835
 Thomas H. Stockton (Methodist), elected December 7, 1835
 Oliver C. Comstock (Baptist), elected December 5, 1836
 Clerk: Walter S. Franklin
 Doorkeeper: Overton Carr
 Sergeant at Arms: Thomas B. Randolph, until December 15, 1835
 Roderick Dorsey, elected December 15, 1835
 Reading Clerks: 
 Postmaster: William J. McCormick

See also 
 1834 United States elections (elections leading to this Congress)
 1834–35 United States Senate elections
 1834–35 United States House of Representatives elections
 1836 United States elections (elections during this Congress, leading to the next Congress)
 1836 United States presidential election
 1836–37 United States Senate elections
 1836–37 United States House of Representatives elections

Notes

References

External links
Statutes at Large, 1789–1875 
Senate Journal, First Forty-three Sessions of Congress
House Journal, First Forty-three Sessions of Congress
Biographical Directory of the U.S. Congress 
U.S. House of Representatives: House History 
U.S. Senate: Statistics and Lists